Thomas Wentworth Beaumont (5 November 1792 – 20 December 1848) of Bretton Hall, Wakefield in Yorkshire, and of Bywell Hall in Northumberland, was a British politician and soldier. In 1831, at the time he inherited his mother's estate, he was the richest commoner in England.

Origins
He was born in Old Burlington Street in Mayfair, London, the eldest son of Thomas Richard Beaumont by his wife Diana Wentworth, daughter of Sir Thomas Wentworth, 5th Baronet.

Career
Beaumont was educated at Eton College and St John's College, Cambridge, where he graduated with a Bachelor of Arts in 1813. He served as lieutenant-colonel of the Northumberland Militia, but resigned in 1824. In 1826, he fought a duel with John Lambton later 1st Earl of Durham. He was president of the Literary Association of the Friends of Poland and a member of the Royal Yacht Squadron.

In 1816 Beaumont stood as Member of Parliament (MP) for Northumberland, the same constituency his father had represented before. He lost this seat in 1826, however was successful for Stafford in a by-election in 1826. After the general election of 1830 Beaumont was returned again for Northumberland, until in 1832, the constituency was split into a north and south division. Beaumont was elected for the latter, and sat then for South Northumberland until his retirement from politic in 1837. Initially a Tory, he was considered a Liberal from 1820.

Marriage and progeny
On 22 November 1827 Beaumont married Henrietta Jane Emma Hawks Atkinson, daughter of John Atkinson, by whom he had two daughters and four sons, including:
Wentworth Beaumont, 1st Baron Allendale, eldest son and heir, raised to the peerage in 1906;
Somerset Archibald Beaumont, 3rd son, MP for Newcastle-upon-Tyne and Wakefield.

Death and burial
Beaumont died at the age of 56 at Bournemouth and was buried at his seat Bretton Hall, Wakefield, Yorkshire.

References

External links

1792 births
1848 deaths
Alumni of St John's College, Cambridge
Tory MPs (pre-1834)
Whig (British political party) MPs for English constituencies
Members of the Parliament of the United Kingdom for Stafford
People educated at Eton College
UK MPs 1818–1820
UK MPs 1820–1826
UK MPs 1826–1830
UK MPs 1830–1831
UK MPs 1831–1832
UK MPs 1832–1835
UK MPs 1835–1837
Committee members of the Society for the Diffusion of Useful Knowledge